Pelochrista labyrinthicana is a species of moth of the family Tortricidae. It is found in China (Xinjiang), Russia, Kazakhstan, Turkmenistan, Tajikistan, where it has been recorded from Romania and Ukraine.

The wingspan is 20–25 mm. Adults have been recorded on wing in August.

References

Moths described in 1872
Eucosmini